William Shaw (born 3 October 1897) was an English professional footballer who played as a forward. He scored 21 goals in 39 appearances in the Football League playing for Southend United in the 1925–1926 season.

Playing career
Shaw was born in Swinton, and began his football career with Frickley Colliery, before turning professional with Bradford City in 1921. He spent two seasons with Bradford before moving to Chesterfield in 1923 where he only made two first team appearances. Before the 1924–25 season he moved again, joining Scunthorpe United for one season. In 1925 he moved to Southend United, netting 18 league goals and 21 in total for the season but moved again at the end of the season to Gainsborough Trinity where he scored 70 league goals in one season, setting a Midland League record. In 1928 he moved yet again, to Cardiff City, but returned to Gainsborough in the same season.

References

1897 births
Year of death missing
English footballers
Association football forwards
Frickley Athletic F.C. players
Bradford City A.F.C. players
Chesterfield F.C. players
Scunthorpe United F.C. players
Southend United F.C. players
Gainsborough Trinity F.C. players
Cardiff City F.C. players
English Football League players
Place of death missing